Humahuaca Department is a department located in the Jujuy Province of Argentina.  Its capital city is Humahuaca.

References 

Departments of Jujuy Province